Streptomyces durhamensis is a bacterium species from the genus of Streptomyces which has been isolated from soil from a tomato plant. Streptomyces durhamensis produces durhamycin and filipin.

See also 
 List of Streptomyces species

References

Further reading

External links
Type strain of Streptomyces durhamensis at BacDive -  the Bacterial Diversity Metadatabase

durhamensis
Bacteria described in 1966